Moose River is a town in Somerset County, Maine, United States. The population was 188 at the 2020 census. It was first settled by Capt. Samuel Holden who in 1820 opened an inn as a stop for cattle drivers en route from Boston to Quebec.

Geography

Education

Demographics

2010 census
As of the census of 2010, there were 218 people, 95 households, and 62 families living in the town. The racial makeup of the town was 96.8% White, 1.4% Native American, 0.5% Asian, and 1.4% from two or more races. Hispanic or Latino of any race were 3.7% of the population.

There were 95 households, of which 27.4% had children under the age of 18 living with them, 58.9% were married couples living together, 5.3% had a female householder with no husband present, 1.1% had a male householder with no wife present, and 34.7% were non-families. 25.3% of all households were made up of individuals, and 10.5% had someone living alone who was 65 years of age or older. The average household size was 2.29 and the average family size was 2.81.

The median age in the town was 45.6 years. 19.7% of residents were under the age of 18; 5% were between the ages of 18 and 24; 23.8% were from 25 to 44; 37.6% were from 45 to 64; and 13.8% were 65 years of age or older. The gender makeup of the town was 49.5% male and 50.5% female.

2000 census
As of the census of 2000, there were 219 people, 81 households, and 54 families living in the town.  The population density was 5.4 people per square mile (2.1/km).  There were 122 housing units at an average density of 3.0 per square mile (1.2/km).  The racial makeup of the town was 96.35% White, 0.46% African American, and 3.20% from two or more races. Hispanic or Latino of any race were 3.20% of the population.

There were 81 households, out of which 34.6% had children under the age of 18 living with them, 59.3% were married couples living together, 3.7% had a female householder with no husband present, and 33.3% were non-families. 23.5% of all households were made up of individuals, and 6.2% had someone living alone who was 65 years of age or older.  The average household size was 2.46 and the average family size was 3.02.

In the town, the population was spread out, with 24.7% under the age of 18, 4.6% from 18 to 24, 26.5% from 25 to 44, 26.0% from 45 to 64, and 18.3% who were 65 years of age or older.  The median age was 42 years. For every 100 females, there were 110.6 males.  For every 100 females age 18 and over, there were 108.9 males.

The median income for a household in the town was $31,042, and the median income for a family was $43,214. Males had a median income of $27,159 versus $20,833 for females. The per capita income for the town was $13,644.  About 7.1% of families and 7.3% of the population were below the poverty line, including none of those under the age of eighteen and 27.6% of those 65 or over.

References

Towns in Somerset County, Maine
Towns in Maine